Dennis Henry Holtschneider (born January 14, 1962) is president of the Association of Catholic Colleges and Universities.

Previously, he was the executive vice president and chief operations officer for Ascension Health, serving from July 2017 through June 2019. Prior to this, he served as president of DePaul University in Chicago, United States, serving from July 2004 through June 2017.

Early life

A native of Detroit, Michigan, he is a 1985 graduate of Niagara University with a bachelor's degree in mathematics. He is a member of the Congregation of the Mission, an order of Catholic priests founded by St. Vincent de Paul and commonly referred to as Vincentians.  He received a doctorate in higher education administration from Harvard University in 1997.

Career

Holtschneider served as executive vice president and chief operating officer of Niagara University from 2000-04. He taught and served in several academic administrative roles at St. John's University between 1996 and 1999.

Holtschneider was the director and rector of Vincentian College Seminary in Ozone Park, New York, from 1989 to 1992. Since 2008, he has been a faculty member in the Harvard Graduate School of Education, teaching seminars and institutes on strategy, governance and management development, among others. He taught summer institutes on strategic planning at the Villanova University Center for the Study of Church Management from 2006-10. He served also as clinical associate professor of higher education in the Graduate School of Education at the University at Buffalo.

Governance

Holtschneider has served in leadership roles on several national advocacy boards for higher education. He joined the American Council on Education's board of directors in 2013, was a trustee for the National Association of Independent Colleges and Universities in 2012-13, and was a trustee for the Association of Catholic Colleges and Universities from 2009 to 2015, including serving as chair of that board from 2010-2012. He spent five years as a member of the school board for Chicago Catholic Schools (2009-14) and nine years as a trustee of the Chicago History Museum (2007-2016).

Honors and affiliations
Holtschneider holds seven honorary degrees, the most recent of which was awarded in December 2016 from Soka University in Tokyo. In 2015, he received the American Council on Education’s Council of Fellows Mentor Award, recognizing his guidance in preparing the next generation of academic leaders in higher education.

In 2012, he was noted as one of Diversity MBA Magazine's "Top 100 under 50 Diverse Executive Leaders". In 2011, he was honored by the Archdiocese of Chicago with its "Strangers No Longer Award" for his leadership on comprehensive immigration reform.

Publications
Holtschneider has conducted research  and written extensively on higher education strategy and governance.

Trusteeship Magazine published his article, "Strategic Capacity: Strengthening University Boards to Govern Strategy" in its November/December 2016 issue. His chapter on "Raising Academic Quality: A Playbook", appeared in Strategies for University Management  in 2016. His chapter "Strategy" appeared in the 2015-16 Presidential Perspectives Higher Education Thought Leadership Series Innovative Concepts to Achieve Campus Transformation.

References

External links
 

1965 births
American Roman Catholic priests
Harvard Graduate School of Education alumni
Living people
Niagara University alumni
People from Chicago
People from Detroit
People from Niagara County, New York
St. John's University (New York City) faculty
American chief operating officers
Catholics from New York (state)
Catholics from Illinois
Catholics from Michigan